Throne to the Wolves is the fourth studio album by the post-hardcore band From First to Last. This was the only album by From First to Last to be released on the record label Rise Records and is the first and only album the band made without guitarist and backup singer Travis Richter (who left the band in 2009, returning in 2013 as part of their reunion). It is also the band's only release with guitarist Blake Steiner and the band's last release before their hiatus in 2010, until the band's reunion in 2013 whereupon they announced the recording of a new album. No song of the album has become a single, but "Going Lohan", "Cashing Out" and "I'll Inoculate the World with the Virus of My Disillusionment" were released in 2009, before album release, via MySpace for free listening.

Track listing

Personnel
 Throne to the Wolves album personnel as listed on Allmusic.

From First to Last
 Matt Good – lead vocals, lead guitar, keyboards, synthesizers, programming
 Blake Steiner –  rhythm guitar, unclean vocals
 Matt Manning – bass, background unclean vocals
 Derek Bloom – drums, percussion, programming, additional guitars, background vocals

 Production
 Lee Dyess – production, engineer, mixing
 Matt Good – production
 Kamal Moo – management
 Thomson Moore – artwork
 Dan Shike – mastering

References

2010 albums
From First to Last albums
Rise Records albums
Albums produced by Matt Good